Nicotiana alata is a species of tobacco. It is called jasmine tobacco, sweet tobacco, winged tobacco, tanbaku, and  Persian tobacco.

Nictoiana alata is mainly grown as an ornamental plant; numerous cultivars and hybrids are derived from it. In Iran, narghila tobacco is sometimes produced from N. alata; it is not chopped like cigarette tobacco, but broken up by hand.

Flowering season: Summer to fall
Light requirements: Sun to partial shade
Flower color: Lime green, maroon red, white, yellow, pink, and crimson
Height: 30 to 60 cm [12 to 24 inches]
Spacing: 30 to 40 cm [12 to 14 inches]
Comments: Low drought tolerance

Has a lovely fragrance in the evening to night. Most varieties bloom late-afternoon to evening. Seedlings do best when gradually introduced to outdoor environment over the course of a week. Plants tend to self-sow. (Color may be the original or occasionally several colors on one plant).
Deadhead spent flower stalks for best blooming results.

References

Tobacco
alata
Garden plants